Richea acerosa  is a common plant in the family Ericaceae, endemic to Tasmania, Australia. The habitat is alpine and sub-alpine situations in the drier montane areas of the state, mostly in the north east. It may be distinguished from others in the genus by the narrow leaves.

References

Flora of Tasmania
Endemic flora of Tasmania
acerosa
Taxa named by John Lindley